Garrha pyrrhopasta is a moth in the family Oecophoridae. It was described by Turner in 1946. It is found in Australia, where it has been recorded from Queensland.

References

Moths described in 1946
Garrha